Stephen Van Rensselaer Trowbridge (July 4, 1794March 1, 1859) was a Michigander politician.

Early life
Trowbridge was born on July 4, 1794 in Albany, New York. Trowbridge moved to Oakland County, Michigan in 1821.

Career
In 1827, Trowbridge became the first supervisor of Troy, Michigan. Trowbridge was a member of the Michigan Territorial Council from Oakland County from 1828 to 1829. On November 5, 1838, Trowbridge was elected to the Michigan Senate where he represented the 3rd district from January 7, 1839 to 1841. On November 1, 1841, Trowbridge was again elected to the Michigan Senate where he represented the 6th district from January 3, 1842 until the end of 1842.

Personal life
Trowbridge married Elizabeth Conkling in Horseheads, New York in 1815. Together they had at least nine children, including United States Representative Rowland E. Trowbridge. Trowbridge was Presbyterian. Trowbridge was the brother of former Detroit mayor, Charles Christopher Trowbridge.

Death
Trowbridge died in Troy, Michigan on March 1, 1859. Trowbridge was interred at Beach Cemetery in Troy.

References

1794 births
1859 deaths
People from Albany, New York
People from Oakland County, Michigan
Presbyterians from Michigan
19th-century Presbyterians
Michigan Whigs
Michigan state senators
Burials in Michigan
Members of the Michigan Territorial Legislature
20th-century American politicians